"Mr. Rock & Roll" is a song by Scottish singer-songwriter Amy Macdonald. The song is the first track on Macdonald's debut album, This Is the Life. It was her first full single after the limited online release of "Poison Prince" and was released physically in the United Kingdom on 16 July 2007.

The song is to date her most successful in the United Kingdom, charting at  12 on the UK Singles Chart and topping the Scottish Singles Chart. In 2008, following the European success of her single "This Is the Life", "Mr. Rock & Roll" entered the top 10 in Belgium, the Czech Republic, the Netherlands, and Switzerland. This song was featured on the BBC Olympics 2008 programming, where it was played as the show looked over the day's events.

Chart performance
In the United Kingdom, on 15 July 2007, "Mr Rock & Roll" debuted at No. 79 on the UK Singles Chart on downloads alone. Following its physical release the following day, the single jumped up to No. 12 on the same chart while also debuting at No. 1 on the Scottish Singles Chart, becoming Macdonald's highest-charting hit in the UK. It remained in the UK top 100 for 16 weeks and ended the year at No. 126 on the chart's year-end listing.

In early 2008, Macdonald's fourth single, "This Is the Life", became a chart-topping hit across Europe, and "Mr Rock & Roll" was released as the follow-up single on 18 March 2008, becoming a top-10 hit in Flanders (No. 4), the Czech Republic (No. 10), the Netherlands (No. 3), Switzerland (No. 3), and Wallonia (No. 7). It also entered the top 40 in Austria, Germany, Norway, and Sweden. The single was released in the United States on 19 August 2008 but did not chart. It has received a silver certification in the United Kingdom and gold certifications in Belgium and Germany.

Music video
The music video consists of Macdonald playing a guitar in a white room. Pictures of her and a man and another woman walking in town are also seen.

Track listings
UK CD single
 "Mr. Rock & Roll"
 "Somebody New"

UK 7-inch single
A. "Mr. Rock & Roll"
B. "What Is Love"

European CD single
 "Mr. Rock and Roll"
 "A Wish for Something More"
 "Let's Start a Band"

Charts

Weekly charts

Year-end charts

Certifications

References

External links
 Mr. Rock & Roll at amazon.com

2007 singles
2007 songs
Amy Macdonald songs
Number-one singles in Scotland
Songs written by Amy Macdonald
Vertigo Records singles